Zoárd Geőcze de Szendrő (1873–1916) was a Hungarian mathematician famous for his theory of surfaces (Horváth 2005:219ff). He  was born on 23 August 1873 in Budapest, Hungary and died on 26 November 1916 in Budapest.

References 
János Horváth, ed. (2005), A Panorama of Hungarian Mathematics in the Twentieth Century, volume 1, Springer. 

19th-century Hungarian mathematicians
20th-century Hungarian mathematicians
1873 births
1916 deaths
Austro-Hungarian mathematicians
Zoard